Kinolhas (Dhivehi: ކިނޮޅަސް) is one of the inhabited islands of the Raa Atoll administrative division of the Maldives.

History
The island is known to have been ruled by a man from Somalia named Abd al-Aziz of Mogadishu in the 14th century, and was visited by the traveller Ibn Batuta during this time.

Geography

Demography

Migration 
Due to the poor quality and limitations of some of the basic services such as healthcare, education and a lack of economical job opportunities, nearly 30% of the registered residents of the island live in the country's capital, Male'.

Governance

Crime 
The island hardly has any record of serious crimes like drugs, theft and robbery.

Economy 
Most common source of economical work for the residents are fishing and agriculture. Some of the residents also work at Pearl Island Resort in Meedhuhparu Island, a resort Island nearby. Many residents live in Male and work there too.

NGOs 
The most active NGO in the island is Jamiyyathul Ihthihad. Jamiyyathul Ihthihad conducts various activities to islanders for the benefit and the development of the Island. Such activities include the Training Programs and Capacity Building programs on Various fields including Information Technology, Quran recitation Competitions, Football and Volleyball Competition and Bashi Ball Competition for Women. They also carryout other various awareness campaigns Targeted on areas such as Religion, Health and Education.

Education 
The main facility which offers the primary and secondary education in the island is the school namely Kinolhahu School in the island. There are pre-schools which provide the pre-school education to the children of the island. The data provided by island office shows that nearly 80 students study in the Kinolhahu School. Total of 11 teachers work in the school to provide education.

Healthcare 
Health Centre provide the basic health needs to the islanders such as minor injuries, cuts and common cold and flu. If the serious health issue is there, islanders have to go to the nearest Regional hospital located in the atoll capital Ungoofaaru, which will take about 45 minutes in a speed boat.

There are a total of 9 staff members working at the health centre:  1 Medical Officer, 1 male nurse, 2 female nurses, 1 Admin Officer, 1 translator, 1 family health worker, 1 helper and 1 attendant.  As are most of the health sector employees in Maldives, some staff members are expats.  The Medical Officer is Dr. Adeel Akram from Pakistan.  The male nurse, Syam Kumar, and one female nurse are from India.  The rest of the staff members are locals.

References

Islands of the Maldives